Rory B. Quintos (born October 31, 1962) is a Filipino television and film director.  She graduated from the University of the Philippines UP Diliman, major in broadcasting. She began a career in television where she successively spent years as production assistant, production manager, floor director and associate producer before finally crossing over to film as an assistant director first and eventually as a TV and Film director.

Filmography

Film

Television

References

External links
 

1962 births
Living people
Filipino film directors
Quintos,Rory
Filipino people of Scottish descent
Filipino people of Portuguese descent
ABS-CBN people
People from Manila